Cheron Michelle Brylski, (born 1958 in Cheektowaga, New York) is a writer, speechwriter, public relations director and activist who built a career helping minorities and women enter the political mainstream in Louisiana and improve their quality of life through education, health and economic reform. She was the first woman to be appointed to the chartered position Public Information Director for the City of New Orleans by the late Mayor Ernest Nathan Morial. She worked in city government from 1980 to 1986, when she started her own consulting business. For nearly 30 years, her boutique public relations agency, The Brylski Company, headquartered in New Orleans has helped governmental, political and non-profit clients move their message through effective communications.

Personal life 
Ms. Brylski was married to the late Harold F. Baquet, a celebrated photographer in New Orleans. They lived in the Touro Bouligny neighborhood. Ms. Brylski attended Gregory Junior High and graduated from John F. Kennedy High of New Orleans. Both public schools were destroyed in the 2005 levee failure following Hurricane Katrina. She received her Bachelors in Journalism and Political Science from Loyola University of the South in 1980 and a Masters in Political Science from the University of New Orleans in 1983.

Early career 
Ms. Brylski's love of journalism was first encouraged by her high school journalism teacher Lee Maloney and stoked by Tom Bell, Chair, Loyola University's Journalism Department. She landed her first reporting job for the Vieux Carre Courier, edited by William F. Rushton and published by Philip Carter, when she was 17 years old. A feature story she wrote on the plight of Louisiana Native Americans in Dulac, Louisiana to receive federal recognition won top honors with the Society of Professional Journalists. Then-Consumer Advocate Ralph Nader was intrigued by the story and offered her a job in Washington D.C. with Public Citizen's Congress Watch, an investigative newsletter. She returned to Louisiana in 1980 to work on a project with Nader exposing the-late U.S. Senator Russell Long's ties to the oil and gas industry, and his influence in increasing prices at the pump. It was during this project, she was introduced to newly elected Mayor Ernest N. Morial and accepted a job to be his personal writer. This job led to her becoming Morial's Public Information Director and chief speechwriter. She worked for Morial until his death in 1989. Ms. Brylski helped Mayor Dutch Morial and his Administration establish Blacks in City Government, the city's first comprehensive and enforceable Minority Business Enterprise Program, and the city's first Hunger and Homeless policy, which was later adopted as a model by the U.S. Conference of Mayors, among other accomplishments.

Publications (books) 
A North American Accord: Feasible or Futile (1983) by Dr. Werner Feld and Cheron Brylski
The Blink of an Eye: Photographic Memories of New Orleans No More (2010) with Harold F. Baquet

The Brylski Company 
The Brylski Company helps clients develop strategic marketing campaigns designed to increase public education about a specific service or issue, and/or obtain a certain outcome in public policy. The company's focus is to achieve objectives that have a public purpose. Services include strategic planning, a full range of public relations activities, issues development and movement, grassroots ally development, and earned/free media placement. The Brylski Company also helps candidates get elected, and once elected, develop effective public outreach programs to achieve definitive policy goals and objectives. The Brylski Company has worked with presidential, congressional, gubernatorial, statewide and local campaigns scheduled in Louisiana. The Brylski Company is a 100 percent woman-owned firm, a state contractor, a certified City of New Orleans SLDBE, and has the distinction of running more women for elective office than any other company in Louisiana.

Key contributions

Education reform 
In 1992, the Brylski Company worked closely with the New Orleans Metropolitan Area Committee and its then-Director Leslie Gerwin to draft a school reform initiative based on school decentralization. The theory was that empowered school principals would have better control of their school's performance. The plan however was never fully embraced. Then Assessor Ken Carter recruited the Brylski Company to help organize a school board reform effort called Excellence in Education. The effort was successful in electing a reform-majority to the Orleans Parish School Board, but its goals to implement comprehensive changes in school management, were largely abandoned when school board members met up against traditional obstructionists, such as school unions. By 1996, one of the leading reformers, Leslie Jacobs, resigned from the Board to accept a position advising then Louisiana Governor Murphy J. Foster Jr. Between 1996 and 2005, Ms. Jacobs would spearhead a number of policy initiatives, including developing the State and District School Accountability Plan, which empowered local parents to act when school districts were academically failing and yet unresponsive to reforms. The Brylski Company is proud to have helped Ms. Jacobs draft some of these reform documents, such as the initial plan, and work with some of its clients, especially then-Senator Paulette Irons and then-Representative Karen Carter, to pass key legislative reforms that designed Louisiana's school reform movement. Since 2005, the Brylski Company has championed the growth of the charter school movement in Orleans Parish and the State of Louisiana by serving as public relations counsel to the Eastbank Collaborative of Charter Schools, the Greater New Orleans Collaborative of Charter Schools, and the Louisiana Association of Public Charter Schools, as well as helping to establish the first completely virtual charter public school in Louisiana, Louisiana Connections Academy.

Public service 
In 1989, the Brylski Company served as chief strategist to a small group of women advocates dedicated to fighting for women's rights in Louisiana and gaining a gubernatorial veto for the most regressive anti-abortion legislation proposed by a state legislature in the nation. To everyone's surprise, they won. As a result, the Brylski Company helped the Louisiana Legislative Women's Caucus pursue more progressive legislation in areas impacting women and families. As women representation in the Legislature increased by Year 2000, the Caucus under its President Representative Diane Winston conducted the first statewide series of women's needs assessments and conferences in the hopes of establishing a comprehensive business development strategy. The surprising outcome was an overwhelming cry by women for more accessible healthcare services for their families instead of a business development model. A 42-point legislative package was developed and passed by 2002. The Governor's Office of Women's Services was established in this time period, as well as a Children's Cabinet under the Lieutenant Governor's Office (now a permanent part of the Louisiana Governor's Office). The Brylski Company also established a network around the state for healthcare providers and women's organizations to address healthcare issues, the top concern being accessible and affordable healthcare. This network, the Women's Health Access Network, the Louisiana Women's Network and the Louisiana Women's Lobby Network, was instrumental in promoting support for the Louisiana Children's Health Insurance Program (LACHIP), the Louisiana Senior Health Insurance Information Program (SHIIP) and eventually the creation of the Louisiana Senior Rx and Aging and Disability Resource Center programs. Concurrent with these efforts, the Brylski Company promoted the extension of affordable, independent housing for seniors and families in Louisiana through a variety of funding and education programs under the Louisiana Housing Finance Agency. The Brylski Company's networks were critical in helping Louisiana become one of the top three enrollees of seniors in the Medicare Part D program, as well as creating the Elderly Protective Services Program, the Louisiana Ombudsman Program, and LouisianaAnswers.com, through the Governor's Office of Elderly Affairs. Following the 2005 Hurricanes and subsequent levee failures in Louisiana, these networks maintained independently by Brylski Company email-list-serves would be critical to reestablishing communications among healthcare and service providers in Louisiana.

Women's rights 
Out of its efforts to promote women's access to all healthcare options in the late 1980s and 1990s, including contraceptive equity, a statewide campaign called Women Elect 2000 was initiated by the Brylski Company with the Louisiana Women's Network and Louisiana women activists like Danae Columbus, Kim Gandy, Madalyn Schenk, Leslie Gerwin and Julie Schwam Harris to encourage women to qualify in every state legislative race. Elected female legislators increased from five to 10 by 1990; by 2000, the State of Louisiana reached the national average of 23 percent of its legislature being female. Many of these successes were accomplished with the support of the Women's Research Center at Newcomb College/Tulane University as well as the active support of Planned Parenthood of Louisiana, the National Abortion Rights Action League, and the National Organization of Women. The Brylski Company coordinated the City of New Orleans/Orleans Parish School Board's participation in the 1985 World Conference on Women chaired by then First Lady Hillary Clinton. The Brylski Company has been a champion for women's rights and the election of women to public office, including the election of the first woman President of the United States.

Groundbreaking candidates/campaigns 
First African American woman to enter a congressional runoff in Louisiana against a white incumbent: Faye Williams v. Clyde Holloway
First Woman elected to statewide office without prior appointment: Mary Landrieu, State Treasurer
First Woman elected to Lieutenant Governor in Louisiana: Melinda Schwegmann
First African American Woman elected as Assessor, City of New Orleans: Patricia Johnson
First Woman elected as Clerk of Civil District Court, City of New Orleans: Dale Atkins
NO DUKES Campaigns (1988 to 1991) with Staci Rosenberg and June Kahn of New Orleans

References

American women in business
Living people
1958 births
21st-century American women
People from New Orleans
Loyola University New Orleans alumni
University of New Orleans alumni